This article presents the Demographic history of North Macedonia through census results since 1948.

1948 census

TOTAL = 1,152,986
Macedonians = 789,603 (68.5%)
Albanians = 197,603 (17.1%)
Turks = 95,940 (8.3%)
Serbs = 29,721 (2.6%)
Romani = 19,500 (1.7%)
Aromanians = 9,511 (0.8%)
Montenegrins = 2,348 (0.2%)
Croats = 2,090
Muslims = 1,560
Others = 5,324 (0.46%)

1953 census

TOTAL = 1,394,514
Macedonians = 860,699 (66%)
Albanians = 162,000 (12.4%)
Turks = 203,928 (15.6%)
Romani = 20,462 (1.6%)
Serbs = 35,112 (2.7%)
Croats = 2,771
Montenegrins = 2,526 (0.18%)
Muslims = 1,591
Others = 56,981 (1.07%)

1961 census

TOTAL = 1,406,003
Macedonians = 900,685 (71.2%)
Albanians = 183,108 (13%)
Turks = 131,481 (9.4%)
Serbs = 42,728 (2.7%)
Romani = 20,606 (1.5%)
Croats = 3,801
Montenegrins = 3,414 (0.24%)
Yugoslavs = 1,260
Muslims = 3,002
Slovenes = 1,147
Others = 90,549 (1.03%)

1971 census

TOTAL = 1,647,308
Macedonians = 1,142,375 (69.3%)
Albanians = 279,871 (17%)
Turks = 108,552 (6.6%)
Romani = 24,505 (1.5%)
Yugoslavs = 3,652 (0.24%)
Serbs = 46,465 (2.85%)
Aromanians = 7,000 (0.42%)
Croats = 3,882
Montenegrins = 3,246 (0.19%)
Muslims = 1,248
Others = 34,005 (1.55%)

1981 census

TOTAL = 1,909,146
Macedonians = 1,279,323 (67%)
Albanians = 377,208 (19.8%)
Turks = 86,591 (4.5%)
Romani = 43,125 (2.3%)
Aromanians = 6,384 (0.3%)
Serbs = 44,613 (2.3%)
Muslims = 39,555 (2.2%)
Yugoslavs = 14,240
Croats = 3,349
Montenegrins = 3,940 (0.21%)
Others = 10,818 (0.56%)

1991 census

TOTAL = 2,033,964
Macedonians = 1,328,187 (65.3%)
Albanians = 441,987 (21.73%)
Turks = 77,080 (3.79%)
Romani = 52,103 (2.56%)
Aromanians = 7,764 (0.38%)
Serbs = 42,755 (2.1%)
Muslims = 31,356 (1.54%)
Greeks = 474 (0.02%)
Bulgarians = 1,370 (0.07%)
Others = 50,888 (2.6%)

1994 census

TOTAL = 1,936,877
Macedonians = 1,288,330 (66.5%)
Albanians = 441,104 (22.86%)
Turks = 77,252 (4%)
Romani = 43,732 (2.25%)
Aromanians = 8,467(0.44%)
Serbs = 39,620 (2.04%)
Others = 34,960 (1.8%)

2002 census

TOTAL = 2,022,547
 Macedonians: 1,297,981 (64.17%)
 Albanians: 509,083 (25.17%)
 Turks: 77,959 (3.85%)
 Romani: 53,879 (2.66%)
 Serbs: 35,939 (1.78%)
 Bosniaks 17,018 (0.84%)
 Aromanians: 9,695 (0.479%)
 Egyptians: 3,713 (0.184%)
 Croats: 2,686 (0.133%)
 Muslims: 2,553 (0.13%)
 Montenegrins: 2,003 (0.1%)
 Bulgarians: 1,418 (0.073%)
 Greeks: 422 (0.021%)
 Russians: 368 (0.018%)
 Slovenes: 365
 Poles: 162
 Ukrainians: 136
 Hungarians: 129
 Germans: 88
 Czechs: 60
 Slovaks: 60
 Jews: 53
 Italians: 46
 Austrians: 35
 Rusyns: 24
 Regionally affiliated: 829
 Non-declared: 404
 Others: 5,332 (0.264%)

2021 census

See also
Demographics of North Macedonia

References

 Nasevski, Boško; Angelova, Dora. Gerovska, Dragica (1995). Македонски Иселенички Алманах '95. Skopje: Матица на Иселениците на Македонија.
 Statistical Yearbook of the Republic of Macedonia 2004 (CD version)
 2002 Macedonian Census

External links
State Statistical Office of the Republic of North Macedonia

1948 establishments in the Socialist Republic of Macedonia
North Macedonia
History of North Macedonia

mk:Република Македонија#Демографија
sr:Демографија Републике Македоније